Frank Hastings Hamilton (September 13, 1813 in Wilmington, Vermont – August 11, 1886 in New York City, New York) was an American surgeon.

Hamilton was the son of Calvin and Lucinda (Hastings) Hamilton.  Through his mother, he was a descendant of Thomas Hastings who came from the East Anglia region of England to the Massachusetts Bay Colony in 1634.  Hamilton graduated from Union College in 1830 and received the degree of MD degree at the University of Pennsylvania in 1835.

After teaching in various colleges, he became in 1861 professor in the Bellevue Hospital Medical College.  He was a military surgeon for two years in the Civil War and was appointed medical inspector with the rank of lieutenant colonel in 1863.  Among the many positions of honor and trust which he held was the presidency of the New York Society of Medical Jurisprudence.

He served as consulting surgeon to various hospitals and asylums and became widely known as an authority on surgery, his three large works having a recognized place in the literature of medical science.  They are:  
 Treatise on Fractures and Dislocations (1860)
 Practical Treatise on Military Surgery (1861)
 The Principles and Practice of Surgery (1872)

In his later years, his place in history was secured by a tragic event.  "Almost immediately after President Garfield was shot in 1881, Mrs. Garfield insisted upon sending for Dr. Hamilton.  He was telegraphed for, and a special train being provided him, he went directly to the President's bedside.  Until the President died, Dr. Hamilton in connection with Drs. Bliss and Agnew was almost constantly in attendance."

Terms
 Hamilton's bandage — a compound bandage for the lower jaw, composed of a leather string with straps of linen webbing.
 Hamilton's pseudophlegmon — a circumscribed swelling which may become red and indurated, but never suppurates.
 Hamilton's test — When the shoulder joint is luxated, a rule or straight rod applied to the humerus can be made to touch the outer condyle and the acromion at the same time.  
Dorland's Medical Dictionary (1938)

Death and burial
Hamilton died at his home in New York City on August 11, 1886.  He was buried at Sleepy Hollow Cemetery in Sleepy Hollow, New York.

Family
Hamilton was the great-grandfather of Frank H. Davis, who served as Vermont State Treasurer from 1969 to 1975.

See also

References

1813 births
1886 deaths
People from Wilmington, Vermont
Physicians from New York City
American science writers
People of New York (state) in the American Civil War
Union Army colonels
Union Army surgeons
Perelman School of Medicine at the University of Pennsylvania alumni
Union College (New York) alumni
Burials at Sleepy Hollow Cemetery